The 1979 Idaho Vandals football team represented the University of Idaho in the 1979 NCAA Division I-AA football season. The Vandals were led by second-year head coach Jerry Davitch and were members of the Big Sky Conference. They played their home games at the Kibbie Dome, an indoor facility on campus in Moscow, Idaho.

They won four of five in mid-season, but dropped their final four games. Idaho lost to rival Boise State for the third straight year; the Broncos went undefeated in conference play but were on probation for a scouting violation and not eligible for the title or the I-AA playoffs.

Notable players
Junior running back Glen White was the Vandals' leading rusher in 1979, the best season by a UI running back in the 1970s.  the opener  but gained 889 yards and averaged 5.0 yards per carry in the final ten games; in the game at Idaho State, he rushed for 163 yards on  A military brat, White graduated from Kaiserslautern American High School in West Germany in 1977. All-Europe for  he had not been recruited by college football programs; a high school coach was a former Vandal and alerted UI head coach 

Future NFL linebacker Sam Merriman of Tucson, Arizona, was a standout on defense in 1979 as a true freshman.

Schedule

Roster

All-conference
Tackle Kyle Riddell, center Larry Coombs, defensive tackle Mark McNeal, and placekicker Pete O'Brien were named to the all-conference team. Second team selections were safety Ray McCanna and linebacker Sam Merriman, a true freshman.

NFL Draft
One Vandal senior was selected in the 1980 NFL Draft, which lasted twelve rounds (333 selections).

List of Idaho Vandals in the NFL Draft

References

External links
Idaho Argonaut – student newspaper – 1979 editions

Idaho
Idaho Vandals football seasons
Idaho Vandals football